Dinesh Joseph Wadiwel is an Australian social and political theorist who is presently a Senior Lecturer in Human Rights and Socio-Legal Studies at the University of Sydney. His work addresses critical animal studies, the rights of disabled people, and theoretical perspectives on violence.

Career
Wadiwel worked for 15 years in the third sector, including with the Council of Social Service of New South Wales. He completed his doctorate in Political Philosophy and Cultural Studies at the University of Western Sydney in 2006. He subsequently moved to the University of Sydney, where he is now a senior lecturer.

Wadiwel is the author of the 2015 monograph The War Against Animals, published by Brill. In the book, he argues that humans are in a state of (literal) war with animals. The primary philosophical influence is the work of Michel Foucault, though other important influences include Giorgio Agamben, Roberto Esposito, and Achille Mbembe. For Wadiwel, mainstream approaches to animal ethics (including the classic works of Peter Singer and Tom Regan, and more recent works of Donna Haraway as well as those of Sue Donaldson and Will Kymlicka) are insufficient for failing to appreciate the near-complete internalisation of a human belief in sovereignty over animals; indeed, he argues that the works reinforce them. Drawing upon Foucauldian notions of biopower, governmentality, and counter-conduct, Wadiwel argues for the existence of, and examines the detail of, the war against animals. He argues that capitalism is complicit in the war, and that the commodification of animals is an inherently violent act. Wadiwel calls for resistance against the war. This resistance includes veganism and other pro-animal practices, but also a truce, even if only (initially) for a day.

Wadiwel was a part of The Human Animal Research Network Editorial Collective that edited the 2015 Sydney University Press collection Animals in the Anthropocene: Critical Perspectives on Non-human Futures. He also co-edited the 2016 collection Foucault and Animals with Matthew Chrulew.

Select bibliography

References

Further reading

Living people
Year of birth missing (living people)
Australian animal rights scholars
Australian sociologists
Australian philosophers
Australian political philosophers
Foucault scholars
Disability studies academics
Western Sydney University alumni
Academic staff of the University of Sydney